A list of prominent buildings in Bucharest, Romania, organized alphabetically within each category.

Churches 

 Anglican Church
 Antim Monastery (Mănăstirea Antim)
 Apostle's Church (Biserica Sfinţii Apostoli)
 Boteanu Church
 Bucharest Bărăția – oldest Roman Catholic church
 Bucur the Shepherd (Bucur Ciobanul) – the oldest standing
 Doamnei Church (Biserica Doamnei)
 Domnița Bălașa Church
 Italian Church (Chiesa Italiana / Biserica Italiană)
 Kretzulescu Church
 New St. George Church (Sf. Gheorghe Nou)
 Patriarchal Cathedral (Catedrala Patriarhală)
 Radu Vodă Monastery
 Sacré-Cœur French Church
 St Anthony Curtea Veche Church
 St. Joseph's Cathedral (Catedrala Sfântul Iosif), Roman Catholic Cathedral
 St. Nicholas (formerly known as the Russian Church)
 Stavropoleos Church (Biserica Stavropoleos)
 Saint Haralambie Church (Biserica Sfântul Haralambie)

Museums

Colleges and universities 

Public Universities and Colleges:
 National Academy of Sports (Academia Naţională de Educaţie Fizică şi Sport)
 Academy of Economic Studies (Academia de Studii Economice)
 Architecture Institute (Institutul de Arhitectură Ion Mincu)
 Microtechnology Institute (Institutul de Microtehnologie)
 University of Bucharest (Universitatea București)
 Polytechnic University of Bucharest (Universitatea Politehnică București)
 Technical University of Construction (Universitatea Tehnică de Construcţii)
 Carol Davila University of Medicine and Pharmacy (Universitatea de Medicină şi Farmacie Carol Davila)
 University of Agronomy and Veterinary Medicine (Universitatea de Ştiinţe Agricole şi Medicină Veterinară)
 Music University (Universitatea de Muzică)
 Art University (Universitatea de Arte)
 Caragiale Academy of Theatrical Arts and Cinematography (Universitatea de Artă Teatrală şi Cinematografică "Ion Luca Caragiale")
 National School of Political Science and Public Administration (Şcoala Naţională de Studii Politice şi Administrative)

Source: the Law on the Organization of the Education and Research Ministry .

Miscellaneous 

 Bucharest Mall
 City Mall
 Plaza Romania
 Unirea Shopping Center
 House of the Free Press
 National Military Center (Cercul Militar Naţional)
 Creţulescu Palace
 Elisabeta Palace
 Palace of the Parliament (Palatul Parlamentului)
 Palace Casino
 Pasajul Macca-Vilacrosse
 ruins of the Old Court (Curtea Veche)
 Central University Library of Bucharest (Biblioteca Centrală Universitară)

Office Buildings 
 Bucharest Financial Plaza
 BRD Tower Bucharest
 City Gate Towers
 Crystal Tower
 Euro Tower
 Globalworth Tower
 Floreasca City Center
 Bucharest Tower Center

Theaters 

 Act Theater (Teatrul Act)
 C. Tănase Theater (Teatrul C. Tănase), home of a satirical revue
 Casandra Theater Studio (Studioul Casandra), student theater
 Comedy Theater (Teatrul de Comedie)
 Excelsior Theater (Teatrul Excelsior)
 Green Hours Theater (Teatrul Luni de la Green Hours)
 Ion Creangă Theater (a puppet theater)
 Bulandra Theatre
 Nottara Theater (Teatrul Nottara)
 Odeon Theatre
 Operetta (Teatrul Naţional de Operetă)
 National Theatre Bucharest (Teatrul Naţional I.L. Caragiale)
 Small Theater (Teatrul Mic)
 Ţăndărică Theater (a puppet theater)
 Theatrum Mundi
 Union Theater
 State Jewish Theater (Teatrul Evreiesc de Stat)
 Very Small Theater (Teatrul Foarte Mic)
 In Culise Theatre (Teatrul In Culise)

Other performance venues 
 Radio Hall (Sala Radio)
 Romanian Athenaeum (Ateneul Român)
 Romanian National Opera (Opera Română)

Hotels 

This is not a comprehensive list of hotels in Bucharest, only those of architectural or historic significance.

 Athenee Palace Hilton Bucharest Hotel
 InterContinental Bucharest

Restaurants 

This is not a comprehensive list of restaurants in Bucharest, only those of architectural or historic significance.

 Caru' cu Bere
 Casa Capșa

Bars and Clubs 
This is not a comprehensive list of bars and clubs in Bucharest, only those of architectural or historic significance or which are significant as performance venues.

 Caru' cu Bere (literally, "beer wagon")
 Lăptăria Enache (literally, "Enache's milk-shop")

External links 
 Bucharest Historical Monuments Map
 Illustrations of Bucharest Historical Buildings

 
Buildings